HarbourFront MRT station is an underground Mass Rapid Transit (MRT) interchange station in Singapore. The termini of the North East line (NEL) and Circle line (CCL), the station serves the HarbourFront area and Sentosa. Surrounding retail and commercial developments include VivoCity and HarbourFront Centre, and the station is near HarbourFront Bus Interchange and the Singapore Cruise Centre.

The NEL station was first announced as World Trade Centre MRT station in March 1996 as one of the line's 16 stations. Its construction involved several road diversions and the opening of the drainage culverts. The NEL station was completed on 20 June 2003. The CCL platforms opened on 8 October 2011 along with Stages 4 and 5 of the line.

Reflecting the station's location by the Singapore Strait, the station concourse has an elliptical motif resembling a ship hull. The station features three artworks as part of the Art-in-Transit programme. The NEL platforms and concourse display a series of line-drawings by Ian Woo, while the CCL platforms feature Commuting Waves by Jason Ong and a set of art seats entitled Matrix.

History

North East line

In preliminary studies for the North East line (NEL) in 1986, it was planned for the line to terminate at Outram Park station, rather than HarbourFront. In a later study in 1995, the planned NEL was extended to serve World Trade Centre. After plans for the new line were approved by the government in January 1996, the station, then tentatively named World Trade Centre, was among the 16 NEL stations announced by communications minister Mah Bow Tan in March 1996.

The contract for constructing the station and tunnels was awarded to Hyundai Engineering & Construction at S$132.8 million (US$ million in ). The scope of the contract included the widening of a section of Telok Blangah Road. The new station was expected to boost retail and residential developments in the Telok Blangah area, which was known for the Keppel Harbour and associated industries. The Port of Singapore Authority (PSA) had cooperated with the Land Transport Authority (LTA) officials on redevelopment plans for the area. To minimise impact on businesses in the area, the contractor used silent pilers when driving steel piles into the ground. These pilers created less noise and vibrations compared to conventional pilers.

The station was constructed near the seashore. In order to prevent water seepage into the site, the contractors injected cement into the soil surrounding the station site via jet grouting. Sheet piles were installed around the site, and tests were conducted to determine the amount of saltwater and groundwater at the site. The contractor initially considered rerouting the drainage system that channelled water to the sea but that was financially unfeasible. Instead, the culverts that crossed the site were cut open and diverted into temporary steel culverts or pipes that did not obstruct the works. Due to the limited space, two of the World Trade Centre's exhibition halls were demolished to facilitate construction works.

Concurrently, the Telok Blangah Road was being upgraded with a new vehicular overpass being constructed. Hence, the LTA's road and rail project teams had to coordinate to maximise the efficiency of both projects.  The rail project team had constructed 10 viaduct foundations for the road section that crosses the station site. At the same time, the contractor had to maintain the traffic flow in the area – not just for visitors to the World Trade Centre, but to prevent delays and disruptions to port operations nearby. The traffic was diverted to temporary steel decking that ran over the construction site. The roads were diverted at least 30 times for the station's construction.

A dual-mode tunnel boring machine was used to deal with the varying soil conditions along the tunnel route.
 
HarbourFront station opened on 20 June 2003 with the rest of the NEL stations. Completed at the end of 2014 at a cost of S$8.2 million (US$ million), the extension is to facilitate quicker turnarounds for southbound trains.

As part of a joint emergency preparedness exercise by the LTA and train operators SBS Transit and SMRT, security screenings were held at the station on 2 August 2019. The screening machines deployed for the exercise include mass screening devices and X-Ray machines to check for possible threat items like firearms. Such exercises were conducted to test established response protocols and maintain vigilance for quicker and more effective responses during emergencies and heightened security situations.

Circle line

In 2001, Yeo Cheow Tong, the communications minister, announced that the Circle line (CCL) will serve the HarbourFront area. On 12 December 2003, the LTA confirmed that HarbourFront station will interchange with the CCL and the new platforms would be constructed as part of CCL Stage 5 (CCL5). This segment consisted of five stations from West Coast station to this station.

The contract for the fitting out works for the CCL station and connecting tunnels was awarded to SembCorp Engineers & Constructors Pte Ltd (SembCorp E&C) at S$335.38 million (US$ million) in October 2004.

To facilitate construction works for the CCL platforms, Platform A of the NEL station was closed on 30 October 2005. Trains on the NEL from Punggol station terminated at Outram Park station, while a special shuttle train was launched for services between Outram Park and HarbourFront. In December 2009, structure works for the CCL station were completed, with backfilling in progress. As announced by transport minister Lui Tuck Yew during his visit to the CCL4 and 5 stations on 1 August 2011, the CCL platforms began revenue service on 8 October that year.

On 17 January 2013, transport minister Lui Tuck Yew announced that the CCL would be extended from HarbourFront station to Marina Bay station as part of CCL Stage 6. Tunnelling works between this station and Keppel station began on 25 July 2019,  and were completed in August 2020.

Station details

HarbourFront station is the terminus of the NEL and CCL; its official station code is NE1/CC29. On the NEL, the adjacent station is Outram Park station. The next stop on the CCL in the clockwise direction is Telok Blangah station. With the completion of CCL6, the subsequent station in the counterclockwise direction will be Keppel. Designed by Architects61, the station concourse has an elliptical motif resembling a ship hull, alongside floor patterns and the artwork that reflects the station's location by the Singapore Strait.

The station is underneath Telok Blangah Road and has five entrances. HarbourFront station serves various commercial and retail developments including HarbourFront Centre and VivoCity. It is the closest MRT station to the tourist island of Sentosa. The station is also near HarbourFront Bus Interchange, Seah Im Food Centre, Singapore Cruise Centre and Mount Faber Park, along with the cultural sites of Temenggong Mosque and St James Power Station.

The NEL station is designated as a Civil Defence (CD) shelter. It is designed to accommodate at least 7,500 people and can withstand airstrikes and chemical attacks. Equipment essential for the operations in the CD shelter is mounted on shock absorbers to prevent damage during a bombing. When electrical supply to the shelter is disrupted, there are backup generators to keep operations going. The shelter has dedicated built-in decontamination chambers and dry toilets with collection bins that will send human waste out of the shelter.

The NEL and CCL platforms are wheelchair-accessible. A tactile system, consisting of tiles with rounded or elongated raised studs, guides visually impaired commuters through the station, with dedicated tactile routes that connect the station entrances to the platforms or between either line's platforms.

Public artworks
The station displays three artworks as part of the MRT network's Art-in-Transit programme – a showcase of public artworks on the MRT network.

Enigmatic Appearances

Enigmatic Appearances by Ian Woo is a series of line-drawings depicting various sea creatures, ships and clouds in minimalist style. Painted on 60 blue vitreous enamel wall panels, the work was intended to reflect the station's maritime theme and its location near the port. With its "dream-like" quality, the figures are in fragments dispersed throughout the station, allowing commuters in the station to slowly perceive the artwork over time. A set of footprints on the walls at the end of the NEL platforms references the station's role as the terminus of the NEL.

Inspirations for the artwork were derived from what Woo captured in his visit to the HarbourFront area. In addition to taking photos of the area, he wrote about his experiences during his trip. Creating the work required him to co-operate with the station's architects, since the LTA intended to integrate art with the station's design. Although Woo was used to working independently, he learnt to articulate his thoughts and intentions with the architectural team, with the help of NEL art coordinator Constance Sheares. The collaboration allowed Woo and the architectural team to have deeper insights into each other's works. While retaining his creative freedom over the work, Woo ensured that the work was compatible with the technical aspects of the station design.

After the architects and the Art Review Panel approved his line drawings, the figures were painted and enlarged. This process took place across two weeks, with some revisions made due to the artist's dissatisfaction with some of the enlarged figures. The black-and-white figures were then coloured in blue at a vitreous enamel factory in England. Travelling to the factory to oversee the production process, Woo also gave further instructions and ensured the colours of the final product come out right.

Commuting Waves

Displayed on the wall of the CCL platforms near the escalators, Commuting Waves by Jason Ong is a pair of sculptures depicting 3D waveforms. The waveforms were derived from commuter traffic at the station, with the positions of the glass 'fins' representing the passenger volume and train frequencies. The work is intended to reflect the rhythm and flow of human activities, which linked the work to the station's location, human values and the MRT system.

The work was created through indeterminacy, inspired by experimental music of John Cage. The inspiration came when Ong was researching soundwaves (waveforms being a distinctive element of the waterfront area), and intended to create the waveforms based on the station's environment. Two assistants recorded the train frequency and passenger traffic on a randomly selected weekday and weekend. The artist noted that the data was only derived from commuters on the NEL, since the CCL was not yet operational when the work was created. Nevertheless, he concluded that the graph shapes would remain similar if he were to include passenger numbers from the CCL.

The graphs had to be transformed into sculptures that are "aesthetically pleasing". The protrusion and spacing of each "fin" were dependent on the passenger traffic and train frequency respectively. Using phase shift, a concept by minimalist composer Steve Reich, the data lines were spaced out from the original graphs. Each alternating frequency was split into different layers that spread across the walls. The eventual shapes of the waveforms were derived from the freehand outlines of the graphs. These outlines were also mirrored to produce the shapes.

The sculptures are in red, which not only reflects the human rhythm but also complements the CCL station's theme, contrasting with the NEL's blue theme. While initially planned to use metal shapes, upon seeing the portfolio of the production team, Ong changed to glass. Ong grouped the fins into sets of six and used serialism to give each fin a different red "tone". The glass used were opaque edged, but as Ong did not like how it appeared, it was changed to transparent edged. An idea to create an illusion of wave moment was discarded due to various unresolved technical difficulties of getting the appropriate tone and colours for the illusion.

Matrix
The CCL platforms feature a set of "art seats" entitled Matrix. Though the platform seats are intended to be works of art, they are designed to remain functional and practical. This work by Lui Honfay and Yasmine Chan, along with Rain, was selected through the International Art Seats Design Competition in 2006. Matrix consists of a series of benches engraved with the station name in a dot-matrix style on the seat surface. The dot-matrix system was adopted as it was flexible enough to be mass-produced for use in many stations. The intriguing combination of signage and seat "impressed" the judges who awarded it the top prize.

References

Bibliography

External links
 SBS Transit's HarbourFront MRT station official website
 
 Changi Airport to HarbourFront MRT station Route Map

Railway stations in Singapore opened in 2003
Bukit Merah
Railway stations with vitreous enamel panels
Mass Rapid Transit (Singapore) stations